In the mathematical field of representation theory, a Lie algebra representation or representation of a Lie algebra is a way of writing a Lie algebra as a set of matrices (or endomorphisms of a vector space) in such a way that the Lie bracket is given by the commutator. In the language of physics, one looks for a vector space  together with a collection of operators on  satisfying some fixed set of commutation relations, such as the relations satisfied by the angular momentum operators.

The notion is closely related to that of a representation of a Lie group. Roughly speaking, the representations of Lie algebras are the differentiated form of representations of Lie groups, while the representations of the universal cover of a Lie group are the integrated form of the representations of its Lie algebra.

In the study of representations of a Lie algebra, a particular ring, called the universal enveloping algebra, associated with the Lie algebra plays an important role. The universality of this ring says that the category of representations of a Lie algebra is the same as the category of modules over its enveloping algebra.

Formal definition
Let  be a Lie algebra and let  be a vector space.
.
Explicitly, this means that  should be a linear map and it should satisfy

The vector space V, together with the representation ρ, is called a -module. (Many authors abuse terminology and refer to V itself as the representation).

The representation  is said to be faithful if it is injective.

One can equivalently define a -module as a vector space V together with a bilinear map  such that

Examples

Adjoint representations

The most basic example of a Lie algebra representation is the adjoint representation of a Lie algebra  on itself:

Indeed, by virtue of the Jacobi identity,  is a Lie algebra homomorphism.

Infinitesimal Lie group representations
A Lie algebra representation also arises in nature. In particular, for a finite-dimensional vector space V, a representation of Lie groups

determines a Lie algebra homomorphism

For example, let . Denoting it by  one obtains a representation  of G on the vector space . This is the adjoint representation of G. Applying the preceding, one gets the Lie algebra representation .

A partial converse to this statement says that every representation of a finite-dimensional (real or complex) Lie algebra lifts to a unique representation of the associated simply connected Lie group, so that representations of simply-connected Lie groups are in one-to-one correspondence with representations of their Lie algebras.

In quantum physics
In quantum theory, one considers "observables" that are self-adjoint operators on a Hilbert space. The commutation relations among these operators are then an important tool. The angular momentum operators, for example, satisfy the commutation relations
.
Thus, the span of these three operators forms a Lie algebra, which is isomorphic to the Lie algebra so(3) of the rotation group SO(3). Then if  is any subspace of the quantum Hilbert space that is invariant under the angular momentum operators,  will constitute a representation of the Lie algebra so(3). An understanding of the representation theory of so(3) is of great help in, for example, analyzing Hamiltonians with rotational symmetry, such as the hydrogen atom. Many other interesting Lie algebras (and their representations) arise in other parts of quantum physics. Indeed, the history of representation theory is characterized by rich interactions between mathematics and physics.

Basic concepts

Invariant subspaces and irreducibility
A nonzero representation is said to be irreducible if the only invariant subspaces are  itself and the zero space . The term simple module is also used for an irreducible representation.

Homomorphisms
Let  be a Lie algebra. Let V, W be -modules. Then a linear map  is a homomorphism of -modules if it is -equivariant; i.e.,  for any . If f is bijective,  are said to be equivalent. Such maps are also referred to as intertwining maps or morphisms.

Similarly, many other constructions from module theory in abstract algebra carry over to this setting: submodule, quotient, subquotient, direct sum, Jordan-Hölder series, etc.

Schur's lemma

A simple but useful tool in studying irreducible representations is Schur's lemma. It has two parts:

Complete reducibility

Let V be a representation of a Lie algebra . Then V is said to be completely reducible (or semisimple) if it is isomorphic to a direct sum of irreducible representations (cf. semisimple module). If V is finite-dimensional, then V is completely reducible if and only if every invariant subspace of V has an invariant complement. (That is, if W is an invariant subspace, then there is another invariant subspace P such that V is the direct sum of W and P.)

If  is a finite-dimensional semisimple Lie algebra over a field of characteristic zero and V is finite-dimensional, then V is semisimple; this is Weyl's complete reducibility theorem. Thus, for semisimple Lie algebras, a classification of irreducible (i.e. simple) representations leads immediately to classification of all representations. For other Lie algebra, which do not have this special property, classifying the irreducible representations may not help much in classifying general representations.

A Lie algebra is said to be reductive if the adjoint representation is semisimple. In the other direction, the definition of a reductive Lie algebra means that it decomposes as a direct sum of ideals (i.e., invariant subspaces for the adjoint representation) that have no nontrivial sub-ideals. Some of these ideals will be one-dimensional and the rest are simple Lie algebras. Thus, a reductive Lie algebra is a direct sum of a commutative algebra and a semisimple algebra.

Invariants

An element v of V is said to be -invariant if  for all .

Basic constructions

Tensor products of representations

If we have two representations of a Lie algebra , with V1 and V2 as their underlying vector spaces, then the tensor product of the representations would have V1 ⊗ V2 as the underlying vector space, with the action of  uniquely determined by the assumption that

In the language of homomorphisms, this means that we define  by the formula 
.

In the physics literature, the tensor product with the identity operator is often suppressed in the notation, with the formula written as
,
where it is understood that  acts on the first factor in the tensor product and  acts on the second factor in the tensor product. In the context of representations of the Lie algebra su(2), the tensor product of representations goes under the name "addition of angular momentum." In this context,  might, for example, be the orbital angular momentum while  is the spin angular momentum.

Dual representations

Then we can define a representation  by the formula

where for any operator , the transpose operator  is defined as the "composition with " operator:

If we work in a basis, then the transpose in the above definition can be interpreted as the ordinary matrix transpose.

Representation on linear maps

Let  be -modules,  a Lie algebra. Then  becomes a -module by setting .

Representation theory of semisimple Lie algebras 
See Representation theory of semisimple Lie algebras.

Enveloping algebras 

The universal enveloping algebra plays an important role in the representation theory of semisimple Lie algebras, described above. Specifically, the finite-dimensional irreducible representations are constructed as quotients of Verma modules, and Verma modules are constructed as quotients of the universal enveloping algebra.

Let T be the tensor algebra of the vector space . Let  be the quotient ring of T by the ideal generated by elements of the form 
. 
The PBW theorem implies that the canonical map is actually injective.

If  is abelian, then  is the symmetric algebra of the vector space .

Since  is a module over itself via adjoint representation, the enveloping algebra  becomes a -module by extending the adjoint representation. The right regular representation is defined similarly.

Induced representation 
.
Furthermore,  is an exact functor from the category of -modules to the category of -modules. In particular, if  is simple (resp. absolutely simple), then W is simple (resp. absolutely simple). Here, a -module V is absolutely simple if  is simple for any field extension .

The induction is transitive: 
for any Lie subalgebra  and any Lie subalgebra . Then .

Infinite-dimensional representations and "category O"
Let  be a finite-dimensional semisimple Lie algebra over a field of characteristic zero. (in the solvable or nilpotent case, one studies primitive ideals of the enveloping algebra; cf. Dixmier for the definitive account.)

The category of (possibly infinite-dimensional) modules over  turns out to be too large especially for homological algebra methods to be useful: it was realized that a smaller subcategory category O is a better place for the representation theory in the semisimple case in zero characteristic. For instance, the category O turned out to be of a right size to formulate the celebrated BGG reciprocity.

(g,K)-module 

One of the most important applications of Lie algebra representations is to the representation theory of real reductive Lie groups. The application is based on the idea that if  is a Hilbert-space representation of, say, a connected real semisimple linear Lie group G, then it has two natural actions: the complexification  and the connected maximal compact subgroup K. The -module structure of  allows algebraic especially homological methods to be applied and -module structure allows harmonic analysis to be carried out in a way similar to that on connected compact semisimple Lie groups.

Representation on an algebra
If we have a Lie superalgebra L, then a representation of L on an algebra is a (not necessarily associative) Z2 graded algebra A which is a representation of L as a Z2 graded vector space and in addition, the elements of L acts as derivations/antiderivations on A.

More specifically, if H is a pure element of L and x and y are pure elements of A,

H[xy] = (H[x])y + (−1)xHx(H[y])

Also, if A is unital, then

H[1] = 0

Now, for the case of a representation of a Lie algebra, we simply drop all the gradings and the (−1) to the some power factors.

A Lie (super)algebra is an algebra and it has an adjoint representation of itself. This is a representation on an algebra: the (anti)derivation property is the superJacobi identity.

If a vector space is both an associative algebra and a Lie algebra and the adjoint representation of the Lie algebra on itself is a representation on an algebra (i.e., acts by derivations on the associative algebra structure), then it is a Poisson algebra. The analogous observation for Lie superalgebras gives the notion of a Poisson superalgebra.

See also
Representation of a Lie group
Weight (representation theory)
Weyl's theorem on complete reducibility
Root system
Weyl character formula
Representation theory of a connected compact Lie group
Whitehead's lemma (Lie algebras)
Kazhdan–Lusztig conjectures
Quillen's lemma - analog of Schur's lemma

Notes

References
Bernstein I.N., Gelfand I.M., Gelfand S.I., "Structure of Representations that are generated by vectors of highest weight," Functional. Anal. Appl. 5 (1971)
.
A. Beilinson and J. Bernstein, "Localisation de g-modules," Comptes Rendus de l'Académie des Sciences, Série I, vol. 292, iss. 1, pp. 15–18, 1981.

 D. Gaitsgory, Geometric Representation theory, Math 267y, Fall 2005

 

 Ryoshi Hotta, Kiyoshi Takeuchi, Toshiyuki Tanisaki, D-modules, perverse sheaves, and representation theory; translated by Kiyoshi Takeuch
 
N. Jacobson, Lie algebras, Courier Dover Publications, 1979.
 

 (elementary treatment for SL(2,C))

Further reading